Blumberg-Rehhahn station is a railway station in the Rehhahn district of the municipality of Ahrensfelde, located in the Barnim district in Brandenburg, Germany. It is served by the Regionalbahn service RB 25 of the Niederbarnimer Eisenbahn.

References

Railway stations in Brandenburg
Buildings and structures in Barnim
Railway stations in Germany opened in 2013